Aaron's Hill may refer to

 Aaron's Hill, Surrey, a small neighbourhood of Godalming in Surrey
 Aaron's Hill, Somerset, a tiny rural hamlet in Somerset